Jane Murfin (October 27, 1884 – August 10, 1955) was an American playwright and screenwriter. The author of several successful plays, she wrote some of them with actress Jane Cowl—most notably Smilin' Through (1919), which was adapted three times for motion pictures. In Hollywood Murfin became a popular screenwriter whose credits include What Price Hollywood? (1932), for which she received an Academy Award nomination. In the 1920s she lived with Laurence Trimble, writing and producing films for their dog Strongheart, the first major canine star.

Life and career

Jane Macklem was born October 27, 1884, in Quincy, Michigan. In 1907 she married attorney James Murfin, and retained his surname when the marriage ended fewer than five years later.

Murfin began her career with the play Lilac Time, which she co-wrote with actress Jane Cowl. The Broadway production opened February 6, 1917, and ran for 176 performances. Later that year the two women began collaborating, often under pseudonym Allan Langdon Martin, on a series of revivals of World War I melodramas. The pair later collaborated on Daybreak, followed by Information Please (1918) and Smilin' Through (1919).

In Hollywood, Murfin became a leading screenwriter, writing many romantic comedies and dramas by herself or in collaboration.

In 1920, director Laurence Trimble persuaded Murfin to purchase a German Shepherd dog—Strongheart—that became the first major canine film star. Strongheart starred in four films that Trimble directed from Murfin's screenplays: The Silent Call (1921), Brawn of the North (1922), The Love Master (1924) and White Fang (1925).

Murfin is credited with directing one film, Flapper Wives (1924), before the dissolution of her partnership with Trimble. Film historian Kevin Brownlow described this partnership as both professional and personal; although some sources describe Trimble and Murfin as a husband-and-wife filmmaking team, no marriage has been substantiated.

Murfin's later screenwriting credits include Way Back Home (1931), Our Betters (1933), The Little Minister (1934), Spitfire (1934), Roberta (1935), Alice Adams (1935), The Women (1939), Pride and Prejudice (1940), and Dragon Seed (1944).

Murfin was married to director and actor Donald Crisp from 1932 until 1944.

She is buried near Jane Cowl at Valhalla Memorial Park Cemetery.

Personal life 
Murfin was married first to lawyer James Murfin from 1907 to 1912. Her second marriage was to actor Donald Crisp, for whom she would write parts in her scripts; the marriage lasted from 1932 to 1944.

Accolades
Murfin and Adela Rogers St. Johns were nominated for the Academy Award for Best Story for What Price Hollywood? (1932). Frances Marion received the award, for The Champ.

Theatre credits

Select filmography
Murfin is credited as a writer; additional production credits are noted.

References

External links

Jane Murfin at the Women Film Pioneers Project
Photo of Jane Cowl (sitting) and Jane Murfin

1884 births
1955 deaths
Film producers from Michigan
Burials at Valhalla Memorial Park Cemetery
American women film directors
Film directors from Michigan
People from Quincy, Michigan
American women screenwriters
American women dramatists and playwrights
20th-century American dramatists and playwrights
20th-century American women writers
Women film pioneers
Screenwriters from Michigan
American women film producers
20th-century American screenwriters